Carrefour Express is a convenience store chain owned and operated by French retailer Carrefour with locations in three continents. Carrefour Express was created in 2007 to consolidate all convenience stores owned by Carrefour worldwide under one name. In 2010, all convenience store operations in France, including Marché Plus, Champion and Shopi were rebranded as Express.

History
In 2007 the Carrefour express concept was created to replace almost everywhere in the world the convenience stores owned by the Carrefour Group in locations that has small retail area. These include Champion, Norte, GB, Globi and Gima.

International locations

Belgium
Belgian retail chain GB opened its first convenience store, GB express in 1997. In 2000 Carrefour acquired GB from the GIB Group. In 2007 all GB Express locations were rebranded as Carrefour Express.

France
In France, the chain's goal is to replace all convenience stores owned by Carrefour, that could not be converted to either Carrefour City or Carrefour Contact.

In December 2010, the first Carrefour Express is created in Caen, and a second in January 2011 in Poitiers, the third opened in 5th arrondissement of Paris.

In April 2013, there are 252 Carrefour Express stores in France. In August 2013, 272 stores.

Italy
In Italy the chain Dì per Dì was acquired from Promodès in 2007 and starting late 2009 were rebranded Carrefour Express as part of Carrefour's international reorganization.

Romania
Carrefour entered the Romanian market after acquiring local retail chain Artima for €52 million in October 2007, with the rebranding taking place in September 2008, nearly a year later. As of 30 December 2013, Carrefour operates 56 supermarkets in Romania.

Spain
In 2007, the first Carrefour Express was created.

In February 2009 the 100th Carrefour Express opened in Spain.

Turkey
Since September 2007, Carrefour Express also operates in Turkey, locally named "CarrefourSA Express" with only one letter 's' . , there are a total of 189 stores, located in 37 out of the 81 provinces of Turkey.

Former locations

UAE
In the summer of 2011, Carrefour MAF began a rebranding and expansion program with 17 Carrefour express stores across the UAE being converted to Carrefour market outlets.

Greece
In the spring of 2007, Carrefour express acquired all "5' Marinopoulos" from Champion Marinopoulos. On 1 March 2017, they left the Greek market after the acquisition of Marinopoulos by Sklavenitis.

Indonesia
In January 2008, Carrefour Indonesia acquired 75 percent share of local retailer Alfa Supermarket, creating a new supermarket business chain next to the Carrefour hypermarkets in Indonesia. The name "Alfa" was converted to "Carrefour Express". , there were only two Carrefour Express stores in Indonesia: one in Kebayoran Lama, South Jakarta and one in Meruya Ilir, West Jakarta. All of these was replaced by the Transmarket brand since 2020.

These Carrefour express were the first Carrefour's supermarket in Asia; earlier there were only Carrefour hypermarkets in Asian countries.

See also

 Carrefour city
 Champion

References

External links
 Official website 
 Carrefour Express Romania
 Carrefour Express Indonesia
 Carrefour Express Turkey 

Carrefour
Supermarkets of Romania
Supermarkets of Turkey
Supermarkets of the United Arab Emirates
Supermarkets of France
Supermarkets of Belgium
Retail companies established in 2007